Lanzoni is an Italian surname which can refer to the following people:

Fabio Lanzoni, Italian male fashion model and actor.
Matteo Lanzoni, Italian professional football player.
Ronald Lanzoni, Costa Rican long-distance runner.

External links 
 FamilyTreeDNA project for Lanzone and Lanzoni surnames

Italian-language surnames